Malvern is a city in and the county seat of Hot Spring County, Arkansas, United States. Founded as a railroad stop at the eastern edge of the Ouachita Mountains, the community's history and economy have been tied to available agricultural and mineral resources. The production of bricks from locally available clay has earned the city the nickname, "The Brick Capital of the World". The city had a population of 10,318 at the time of the 2010 census, and in 2019 the estimated population was 10,931.

History 
On October 15, 1878, Malvern officially became the county seat of Hot Spring County. The original inhabitants of the county were Native Americans, trappers, hunters, and farmers.

The Hot Springs Railroad, often referred to as the Diamond Jo line, was established as a narrow-gauge railroad by Chicago businessman Joseph Reynolds in 1874. Reynolds began building the Hot Springs Railroad, which extends northwest from Malvern Junction, a station on the Cairo & Fulton, to Hot Springs, after he had endured unsatisfactory stagecoach rides to the latter city. Because Malvern was the closest railroad station to Hot Springs, it became an important junction point for passengers transferring from rail to stagecoach to complete their journey to the spas in Hot Springs. This was the only railroad into Hot Springs for 15 years. The opening of the Little Rock & Hot Springs Western Railroad in April 1900 provided a more direct access to Hot Springs from Little Rock and the north, and both the Choctaw, Oklahoma & Gulf and the Iron Mountain took advantage of this route, effectively cutting the volume of interchange traffic into Malvern. By 1902 passenger train shuttle service through Malvern had essentially ended.

The Malvern Police Department lost Carson Smith, the deputy, and three officers in the line of duty, all shot to death during the 1930s. They were Clyde Davis, Leslie Lee Potts, and Hiram Potts. Davis and Leslie Lee Potts were both shot during a domestic dispute on April 21, 1933, a shootout in which they killed the suspect. Hiram Potts, who was related to Leslie Lee Potts, was shot and killed during his March 4, 1935, attempt to arrest two men who were boarding a train illegally.

During World War II, hundreds of Malvernites moved to the Los Angeles area to take advantage of work in the shipyards—apparently spurred by a couple of residents who found work there and wrote home boasting of 88-cent/hour jobs, which was a decent wage for the time.

Geography 
Malvern is in northeastern Hot Spring County, southeast of the Ouachita River where it exits the Ouachita Mountains. It is bordered to the north by Rockport and to the east by Perla.

Interstate 30 passes through the northwest part of Malvern, with access from Exits 97, 98, and 99. I-30 leads northeast  to Little Rock, the state capital, and southwest  to Texarkana. U.S. Route 67 (Page Avenue) runs through the center of Malvern, leading northeast  to Benton and southwest  to Arkadelphia. U.S. Route 270 passes northeast of Malvern on a bypass, leading east  to Sheridan and northwest  to Hot Springs. Arkansas Highway 9 (Main Street) leads south from the center of Malvern  to Camden.

Climate 
The climate in this area is characterized by hot, humid summers and generally mild to cool winters. According to the Köppen Climate Classification system, Malvern has a humid subtropical climate, abbreviated "Cfa" on climate maps.

Demographics

2020 census

As of the 2020 United States census, there were 10,867 people, 3,911 households, and 2,407 families residing in the city.

2000 census
The racial makeup of the city was 68.16% White, 28.66% Black or African American, 0.35% Native American, 0.29% Asian, 0.07% Pacific Islander, 0.53% from other races, and 1.94% from two or more races. 1.26% of the population were Hispanic or Latino of any race.

The city had 3,769 households, out of which 29.0% contained children under the age of 18, 44.1% were married couples living together, 16.3% had a female householder with no husband present, and 35.5% were non-families. 32.2% of all households were made up of individuals, and 16.8% had someone living alone who was 65 years of age or older. The average household size was 2.33 and the average family size was 2.93. Additionally, 25.0% of the city's population were under the age of 18, 9.3% from 18 to 24, 24.2% from 25 to 44, 21.5% from 45 to 64, and 20.0% were 65 years of age or older. The median age was 38 years; for every 100 females there were 85.0 males and for every 100 females age 18 and over, there were 80.7 males.

The median income for a household in the city was $27,007, and the median income for a family was $34,563. Males had a median income of $27,232 versus $18,929 for females and the per capita income for the city was $14,848. About 15.7% of families and 20.3% of the population were below the poverty line, including 27.6% of those under age 18, and 18.4% of those age 65 or over.

Economy 
The city is home to three Acme Brick plants and several other manufacturing companies, including Weyerhaeuser, Borden Chemical, Adams Face Veneer Company, and Pactiv. It is also the home of Grapette International, the manufacturer of Grapette soda. Malvern is the location of the Ouachita River Unit, a medium security prison.

Arts and culture

Annual cultural events 
Every year on the last weekend of June, Malvern City Park hosts Brickfest, an event that fills the city with music, food and activities that include a brick toss, brick car derby, and a best-dressed brick contest. Malvern also hosts the Hot Spring County Fair and Rodeo each fall.

Tourism 
History in Malvern can be found throughout the central city, including ten National Register of Historic Places listings. Located at 210 Locust Street in downtown Malvern, the art deco Hot Spring County Courthouse has been the center of county government since its construction in 1936. Also located downtown is the Bank of Malvern building, historically notable both for its distinct variation of Richardsonian Romanesque architecture and its importance in transitioning Malvern from an agricultural-based economy to one based on industry. The Hot Spring County Museum is located in the Boyle House at 302 East Third Street in Malvern.

Malvern hosts one of two whitewater parks in the state of Arkansas, located on the Ouachita River. (The other park is in Siloam Springs.) Used for training Olympic kayakers and river rescue teams, the river-wide ledge runs year-round, and is dam-released. A zip line and nature hike are available along Ouachita Bend.

Education

Ełementary and secondary education 
Public education for early childhood, elementary and secondary school students within the Malvern city limits is provided by Malvern School District, which leads to graduation from Malvern High School.

Glen Rose School District of Glen Rose (including Glen Rose High School) and Magnet Cove School District (including Magnet Cove High School) have Malvern postal addresses, but have no facilities in Malvern and do not include any portion of the Malvern city limits.

Postsecondary education 
Arkansas State University Three Rivers

Media 
The city's newspaper is the Malvern Daily Record, established in 1916. It publishes an afternoon edition Tuesday through Friday with a Saturday morning "Weekend Edition" The city also has two radio stations, KLBL (101.5), a Classic Hits format, and KZYP AM-1310, a sports station.

Infrastructure

Transportation 

Malvern is connected on road by Interstate 30, U.S. Route 270, and U.S. Route 67. Amtrak's Texas Eagle provides daily passenger train service to Malvern on a route extending from Chicago to Dallas and Los Angeles, and railroad freight service to Malvern is provided by the Union Pacific Railroad and the Arkansas Midland Railroad, the latter operating over the route of the original Hot Springs Railroad. The Malvern Municipal Airport (FAA Identifier: M78) serves the Malvern area.

Notable people 

 Hollywood Actress Julie Adams, 1926-2019 Born as Betty May Adams was buried at Oak Ridge Cemetery in Malvern.
 Homer Martin Adkins, governor of Arkansas from 1941 to 1945, died in Malvern in 1964
 Fran Bennett, actress, born in Malvern
 Frank Bonner, born in Little Rock and raised in Malvern, an actor and director best known for playing Herb Tarlek on the classic 1970s and 1980s sitcom WKRP in Cincinnati
 Winston Bryant, politician, was born in Malvern.
 Bob Burrow, retired basketball player
 Beth Clayton, award-winning operatic mezzo-soprano
 Isaac Davis, former National Football League (NFL) player and member of Super Bowl XXIX runners-up team San Diego Chargers
 Susan Dunn, Grammy Award-winning operatic soprano
 Blaze Foley, country music singer-songwriter was born in Malvern
 David Delano Glover, Malvern lawyer and U.S. representative from Arkansas' former 6th congressional district, 1929 to 1935
 Claris G. "Crip" Hall, the longest-serving Arkansas Secretary of State, elected to 13 terms, 1937-1961. In 1938, he founded the tradition of lighting of the State Capitol at Christmas.
 Madre Hill, 1995 SEC rushing champion, former NFL player, and member of Super Bowl XXXVII runner-up team Oakland Raiders
 Fred Jones, National Basketball Association (NBA) player, 2004 NBA Slam Dunk Contest winner, and former guard-forward for the New York Knicks
 Tommy McCraw, former MLB player and hitting coach
 Tony Ollison, former defensive tackle for the Arkansas Razorbacks, former strength and conditioning coach for the Dallas Cowboys, and currently a member of the Dallas Desperados of the Arena Football League
 Frank Page, radio broadcaster at KWKH in Shreveport, Louisiana, who in 1954 introduced Elvis Presley to his first national radio audience; born in Malvern in 1925
 Reggie Ritter, professional baseball player
 Gerald Skinner, former National Football League player
 Billy Bob Thornton, motion picture actor, Academy Award-winning writer, and director
 Keith Traylor, NFL player and member of Super Bowl champions Denver Broncos (in 1997 and 1998) and the New England Patriots in 2004
 Jerry Van Dyke, actor and comedian, resided on his ranch near Malvern. 
 Frederick Yates, Michigan state legislator and lawyer, born in Malvern

See also 

List of cities and towns in Arkansas
National Register of Historic Places listings in Hot Spring County, Arkansas

References

Further reading

External links 

 Malvern Chamber of Commerce

 
1876 establishments in Arkansas
Cities in Hot Spring County, Arkansas
Cities in Arkansas
County seats in Arkansas
Populated places established in 1876
Arkansas populated places on the Ouachita River
Sundown towns in Arkansas